James Robert Boyle (born July 27, 1962) is a former American football offensive tackle who played two seasons with the Pittsburgh Steelers of the National Football League. Boyle was drafted by the Miami Dolphins in the ninth round of the 1984 NFL Draft. He played college football at Tulane University and attended Western Hills High School in Cincinnati, Ohio.

References

External links
Just Sports Stats
Fanbase profile

Living people
1962 births
Players of American football from Cincinnati
American football offensive tackles
Tulane Green Wave football players
Pittsburgh Steelers players
National Football League replacement players